Chariton may refer to:

People
Chariton, an ancient Greek author
Chariton, lover of Melanippus, whose mutual love moved even the cruel tyrant Phalaris
Chariton Charitonidis, a Greek classical philologist
Chariton (name), a name, both given and family
Chariton the Confessor (mid-3rd – mid-4th century), saint and ascetic
Jordan Chariton, American reporter

Places
Chariton, Iowa 
Chariton, Missouri
Chariton River
Chariton County
Chariton Township, Appanoose County, Iowa

See also
 Hariton
 Khariton (disambiguation)